Loveland is a center of media in north-central Colorado. The following is a list of media outlets based in the city.

Print

Newspapers
The Loveland Reporter-Herald is the local newspaper, published daily.

Radio
Loveland is in the Fort Collins-Greeley radio market. Loveland is close enough to Denver to allow listeners to receive signals of most radio stations broadcasting from the Denver radio market.

The following is a list of radio stations that broadcast from and/or are licensed to Loveland.

AM

FM

Television
Loveland is in the Denver television market.

References

Loveland